Bojan Navojec (born 26 April 1976) is a Croatian theatre and film actor.

Navojec was born in Bjelovar. He graduated from the Academy of Dramatic Art, University of Zagreb in 2010.

Selected filmography

References

External links 
 

Croatian male actors
Academy of Dramatic Art, University of Zagreb alumni
People from Bjelovar
1976 births
Living people